John Dana may refer to:
John W. Dana (1808–1867), American politician from Maine
 John Cotton Dana (1856–1929), American librarian and museum director